The Copa Nicasio Vila was an official Argentine football cup competition organised by Liga Rosarina de Football. The "Copa Vila" was the top football division in Rosario, being held between 1907 and 1930, when it was replaced by Torneo Gobernador Luciano Molinas.

Rosario Central is the most winning team of Copa Nicasio Vila with 10 titles.

History 

Due to the increasing popularity of football in Argentina –being the city of Rosario among them–, the body established a first division championship, named "Copa Nicasio Vila", named after then major of Rosario, local entrepreneur Nicasio Vila, whose first edition was won by Newell's.

Some of the clubs that took part of the competition were Rosario Central, Newell's Old Boys, Tiro Federal, Central Córdoba, Atlético Argentino (now Gimnasia y Esgrima de Rosario), Nacional (now Argentino de Rosario), Provincial, Belgrano, Sparta, Calzada, Estudiantes, Atlantic Sportsmen, Riberas del Paraná, Washington, among others

The competition was in a hiatus in 1912 because of a conflict between some clubs and Liga Rosarina therefore the competition was not held that season. The 1913 edition was organised by recently created Federación Rosarina, until 1914, when FRF and LRF merged and the championship was held again.

The winner of Copa Nicasio Vila qualified to play the Copa Dr. Carlos Ibarguren against the champion of the Buenos Aires League (that represented the AFA First Division). The champion and the 2nd., 3rd., and 4th. were also qualified to play other AFA national cups, such as the Copa de Competencia and Copa de Honor.

The competition was last held in 1930, shortly before football became professional in Argentina. A new Association (Asociación Rosarina de Fútbol) was created one year later. The Rosarian first division championship continued under the name "Torneo Gobernador Luciano Molinas" in honor of the Governor of Santa Fe Province elected in 1932. A new trophy was designed for the occasion, being awarded since then.

List of Champions

Titles by club

References

V
Recurring events established in 1907
Recurring events disestablished in 1930
1907 establishments in Argentina
Football in Santa Fe Province